Carmel Highlands is an unincorporated community in Monterey County, California, United States. Carmel Highlands is also located just south of the Point Lobos State Reserve, and serves as the northern gateway of the Big Sur coastline along California State Route 1. Carmel Highlands was laid out in 1916 by developers Frank Hubbard Powers and James Franklin Devendorf and the Carmel Development Company.

History

In 1906, the Carmel Development Company purchased  of land from the local ranchers south of Point Lobos, where it developed the Carmel Highlands. In 1915, Frank Devendorf developed the Carmel Highlands as a residential community of creative people dedicated to the arts. Devendorf and his foreman, Frank DeAmaral developed the area with the Highlands Inn as a resort hotel at the center of the development. He planted pine trees and laid out the roads and building sites. His friend, marine artist William Frederic Ritschel, helped him plan sight lines for the hotel that had views north along the coast. The building of the Big Sur Coast Highway in the 1930s opened the area and allowed tourists to discover the area. Point Lobos, which borders the Highlands on the north, became a State Park in 1933.

The Carmel Highlands was important in the development of the regional art colony during the first half of the 20th century.  Here many painters and sculptors found inspiration in the rugged scenery and established studio-homes, including: Ferdinand Burgdorff, Alice Comins, Theodore Criley, Arthur Hill Gilbert, Ralph Helm Johonnot, Ada Howe Kent, George J. Koch, Louise F. MacDougal, John O'Shea, Thomas S. Parkhurst, Ira Mallory Remsen, William Frederic Ritschel, Nora Havel Ritschel.

In 1918, writer Daniel Lewis James's father, D. L. James Sr., (1880–1944), purchased property in Carmel Highlands and hired the firm Greene and Greene to build a stone house on a bluff overlooking the water. Greene supervised the construction of the granite house that took five years to complete. The house was later called "Seaward" and was a summer retreat for the family for 20 years. In 2022 actor Brad Pitt purchased Seaward for $40M.

Ansel Adams, and Edward Weston, whose studio home, Wildcat Hill, is preserved and occupied by his grandson, Kim Weston.

The local Carmel literati frequently socialized in the Highlands, including Lincoln Steffens, Ella Winter, Robinson Jeffers, and Sinclair Lewis.

The real estate in the Carmel Highlands is some of the most expensive in the United States.  Many celebrities have homes and vacation homes in this area. The ZIP Code is 93923, and the community is inside area code 831.

Government

At the county level, Carmel Highlands is represented on the Monterey County Board of Supervisors by Supervisor Mary Adams.

In the United States House of Representatives, Carmel Highlands is in

Notable people
 Brad Pitt, American actor
 John Denver, American singer-songwriter and resident from 1996–1997, died in a plane crash in Monterey Bay near Pacific Grove on October 12, 1997.
 Joan Fontaine, Academy Award winning actress

See also
  List of places in California
 Soberanes Fire, 2016

References

External links

 Carmel Highlands Association

Unincorporated communities in Monterey County, California
Santa Lucia Range
1916 establishments in California
Populated places established in 1916
Populated coastal places in California
Unincorporated communities in California